The City of Your Final Destination is a 2009 American romantic drama film directed by James Ivory and starring Anthony Hopkins, Laura Linney, Charlotte Gainsbourg, Omar Metwally, Hiroyuki Sanada and Norma Aleandro. It was written by Ruth Prawer Jhabvala and based on the eponymous novel by Peter Cameron.

The film is the first Merchant Ivory film production without the participation of producer Ismail Merchant and composer Richard Robbins. Also, it is to date the last film directed by Ivory.

Synopsis
Graduate student Omar Razaghi (Omar Metwally) wishes to write a biography on obscure writer Jules Gund, who died years before. Omar must travel to Uruguay to persuade the Gund family to authorize the biography.

Cast
 Omar Metwally as Omar Razaghi
 Anthony Hopkins as Adam Gund
 Nicholas Blandullo as Young Adam
 Alexandra Maria Lara as Deirdre Rothemund (Deirdre MacArthur in the novel)
 Charlotte Gainsbourg as Arden Langdon
 Laura Linney as Caroline Gund
 Norma Aleandro as Mrs. Van Euwen
 Ambar Mallman as Portia Gund
 Norma Argentina as Alma
 Hector Fonseca as Old Gaucho
 Hiroyuki Sanada as Pete
 Julieta Vallina as Schoolbus Lady
 Sofia Viruboff as Adam's Mother
 James Martin as Postman
 Oscar Rolleri as Young Gaucho
 Arturo Goetz as Mrs. Van Euwen's Guest
 Marcos Montes as Mrs. Van Euwen's Guest
 Sophie Tirouflet as Mrs. Van Euwen's Guest
 Luciano Suardi as Doctor Pereira
 Carlos Torres as Barber
 Pietro Gian as Taxi Driver
 Julia Perez as Nurse
 Yuri Vergeichikov as Luis, the Driver
 Agustín Pereyra Lucena as Guitarist
 Pablo Druker as Conductor
 Eliot Mathews as Deirdre's Escort
 Andrew Sanders as Caroline's Escort
 Jonatan Nahuel Ingla as Gaucho
 Nicolás Zalazar as young student
 Susana Salerno as Helpful Person at the Bus Depot
 César Bordón as Helpful Person at the Bus Depot
 Diego Velazquez (American actor) as Helpful Person at the Bus Depot
 Rossana Gabbiano as Helpful Person at the Bus Depot

The cast had the participation of local actors and citizens who officiated as extras.

Production

Setting
Most of the story in the novel takes place in a small town in Uruguay. The novel's beginning chapter takes place in Lawrence, Kansas, where the protagonist is a graduate student at the University of Kansas. The story ends at the New York City Opera Hall.

Locations 
Most of the filming took place in two ranches located in the coastal area of the Punta Indio district, Buenos Aires, Argentina. Some scenes were filmed in the district's head city Veronica. Other scenes were filmed on the University of Colorado Campus in Boulder.

Soundtrack
The soundtrack contains the following music:

"J'ai perdu mon Eurydice" (from "Orphée et Eurydice"), Performed by Anthony Roth Costanzo, Composer Christoph Willibald Gluck.
"Venetian Medley", Composed and performed by Anthony Hopkins.
"Dos Palomitas", Performed by Charlotte Gainsbourg & Ambar Mallman, Traditional popular song from Argentina.
"The Merry Widow, Second Act: No.7 Introduction. Tanz und Vilja-Lied", Performed by Cheryl Studer and Chorus, Composer Franz Lehár, Deutsche Grammophon.
"Sonata for violin and piano (1943), Intermezzo. Tres lent et calme", Performed by The Nash Ensemble, Composer Francis Poulenc, Hyperion Records.
"Sambaden", Composed and performed by Agustín Pereyra Lucena.
"Sonatine", Performed by Charlotte Gainbourg & Ambar Mallmann, Composer G. Turk, Arranged by Cecilia V. Gonzalez.
"Bastien and Bastienne", Franz Liszt Chamber Orchestra, Raymond Leppard, director, Composer Wolfgang Amadeus Mozart, Sony Classical.
"'El museo de las distancias rotas'" (end title 1), Composed for the film and performed by Jorge Drexler, Ediciones SEA/Warner Chappell.
"'La bruma del ayer'" (end title 2), Composed for the film and performed by Jorge Drexler, Ediciones SEA/Warner Chappell.

Release
It had an early preview in New York City on November 27, 2007 (at the ceremony of the Trophée des Arts for James Ivory from the French Institute New York). In October 2009, James Ivory brought the film to Rome, where it received its official world premiere at the International Rome Film Festival, out of competition, then showing at Tokyo International Film Festival for Hiroyuki Sanada's special screening. Screen Media distributed it in the United States on April 16, 2010.

Reception

Critical reception
The film holds an approval rating of 39% on Rotten Tomatoes, based on 56 reviews, and an average rating of 5.3/10. The website's critical consensus reads: "A stellar cast can't elevate this leaden adaptation that, while just as beautiful as anything director James Ivory's made before, comes off as dusty and dry." On Metacritic, the film has a weighted average score of 52 out of 100, based on 19 critics, indicating "mixed or average reviews".

Controversy
In early 2007, Anthony Hopkins claimed that he had yet to be paid for his work on the film and that Merchant Ivory had short-changed the cast and crew. Merchant Ivory counter-argued that Hopkins' payment terms had, in fact, recently been renegotiated higher. Later in the year, the actor filed court papers to take the company to an arbitrator. In October 2007, Hopkins filed a lawsuit against Merchant Ivory for payment of his salary of $750,000.

In 2008, actress and singer Susan (Suzy) Malick also filed suit against Merchant Ivory and James Ivory for producer credit and $500,000 in an unpaid loan, used when the film was threatened to be shut down due to lack of funding. In 2012, Malick moved for trial by jury, and the suit was settled out of court.

References

External links
 
 
 
 Merchant Ivory Productions
 Screen Media Films
 The Molecule (Clips)
 Roma Cinema Festival
 The World of Sanada Hiroyuki (Tokyo International Film Festival)
 Peter Cameron Review

2002 American novels
American novels adapted into films
Novels set in Uruguay
2009 films
American drama films
2009 drama films
Films based on American novels
Films directed by James Ivory
Films shot in Argentina
Films shot in Buenos Aires
Merchant Ivory Productions films
Films with screenplays by Ruth Prawer Jhabvala
Novels set in Kansas
Films set in Uruguay
PEN/Faulkner Award for Fiction-winning works
Salary controversies in film
Works subject to a lawsuit
Casting controversies in film
2000s English-language films
2000s American films